Robert Boyd Publications is a book publishing company based in Witney, Oxfordshire, England. It concentrates on books covering the history of Oxfordshire in general and Oxford in particular, including "The Changing Faces of ..." book series.

They have published 44 works between 1994 and 2003. Authors they have worked for include Carole Newbigging, Julie Kennedy and Ann Spokes Symonds.

References

External links 
 Robert Boyd Publications website 

Companies with year of establishment missing
Book publishing companies of England
Companies based in Oxfordshire
Defunct companies based in London